Eskiyürük, is a village in Aydıncık district of Mersin Province, Turkey. The name of the village is a composite word; eski means "old" and Yürük  refers to Turkmen people. The population of the village was 344 as of 2012. The main agricultural products of the village are greenhouse vegetables.

References

Villages in Aydıncık District (Mersin)